NFO may refer to:

National Farmers Organization, a producerist movement founded in the United States in 1955.
Naval Flight Officer in the United States Navy or United States Marine Corps.
New Fund Offer, a term used in mutual funds in India.
NFO, EMS code for Norwegian Forest Cat in the Fédération Internationale Féline.
Net Financial Obligations.
.nfo, a filename extension for de facto standard info text files accompanying compressed software.
.nfo, a filename extension used for Folio Infobase data files.
 The Night Flight Orchestra, a Swedish hard rock band.

See also 
 Info (disambiguation)